The Roman Catholic Diocese of Chengdu (formerly spelt Chengtu) is a suffragan Latin diocese in the Ecclesiastical province of Roman Catholic Archdiocese of Chongqing covering southwestern China's Sichuan area, yet depends on the missionary Roman Congregation for the Evangelization of Peoples.
 
Its episcopal see is the Cathedral of the Immaculate Conception (also known as Ping'anqiao Church), in the city of Chengdu, at  Ping'an Alley, Chengdu, Sichuan, China.

Extent 

The diocese, based in Chengdu, covers 4 cities (Chengdu [Tchen-tou-fou], Deyang [Te-yang-hien], Guangyuan [Koang-yuen-hien] and Mianyang [Mien-tcheou-hien]) and 37 districts and counties, totaling an area of 54,900 square kilometers.

No recent statistics available.

History 
 Established on 15 October 1696 as Apostolic Vicariate of Szechwan (四川), on territory split off from the Apostolic Vicariate of Fujian 福建
 Gained territories twice : in 1715 from the suppressed Apostolic Vicariate of Kweichow 貴州 and in 1755 from the suppressed Apostolic Vicariate of Yunnan 雲南
 Lost territories repeatedly : on 1840.08.28 to (re)establish the Apostolic Vicariate of Yunnan 雲南 and on 1846.03.27 to (re)establish the Apostolic Vicariate of Kweichow 貴州 and establish the Apostolic Vicariate of Lhassa 拉薩
 Renamed on 2 April 1856 as Apostolic Vicariate of Northwestern Szechwan (四川西北), having lost territory to establish Apostolic Vicariate of Eastern Szechwan 四川東境)
 Lost more territory on 1860.01.24 to establish the Apostolic Vicariate of Southern Szechwan 南四川
 Renamed again on 3 December 1924 after its see as Apostolic Vicariate of Chengtu (Tchen-tou-fou; 成都)
 Lost territory on 2 August 1929 to establish the Apostolic Vicariate of Shunkingfu (Choen-kin-fou; 順慶府)
 Promoted on 11 April 1946 as Diocese of Chengtu (成都)

Episcopal ordinaries 
(all Roman Rite; so far members of Latin congregations, long European missionaries) 

Apostolic Vicars of Szechwan 四川

 Artus de Lionne, Paris Foreign Missions Society (M.E.P.) (born France) (30 November 1700 - death 2 August 1713) - never resident in diocese; Titular Bishop of Rosalia (1687.02.05 – 1713.08.02), initially as Coadjutor Vicar Apostolic of Szechwan 四川 (1687.02.05 – 1696.10.20)
 Johannes Müllener, Lazarists (C.M.) (born Germany) (8 December 1716 - death 17 December 1742), Titular Bishop of Myriophytos (1715.09.02 – 1742.12.17)
 Luigi Maggi, Dominican Order (O.P.) (born Italy) (December 17, 1742 - August 20, 1743), Titular Bishop of Baris in Hellesponto (1738.10.08 – 1743.08.20), initially as Coadjutor Apostolic Vicar of Szechwan 四川 (1738.10.08 – 1742.12.17)
 Joachim Enjobert de Martiliat, M.E.P. (born France) (August 20, 1743 - death 24 August 1755), Titular Bishop of Echinus (1739.10.02 – 1755.08.24), initially as Coadjutor Apostolic Vicar of Yunnan 雲南 (1739.10.02 – 1743.08.20)
 Father Pierre-Jean Kerhervé, M.E.P. (born France) (1762.07.27 – death 1766.01.22 not possessed), Titular Bishop of Gortyna (1762.07.27 – 1766.01.22)
 Bishop François Pottier, M.E.P. (born France) (24 January 1767 – death 28 September 1792), Titular Bishop of Agathopolis (1767.01.24 – 1792.09.28) 
 Saint Bishop Gabriel Taurin Dufresse, M.E.P. (born France) (徐德新) (15 November 1801 – death 14 September 1815), Titular Bishop of Tabraca (1798.07.24 – 1815.09.14), initially as Coadjutor Apostolic Vicar of Szechwan 四川 (1798.07.24 – 1801.11.15)
 Louis Fontana, M.E.P. (born Italy) (July 1817 – 11 July 1838), Titular Bishop of Sinita (1817.05.24 – 1838.07.11), later Apostolic Vicar of Hupeh and Hunan 湖廣 (China) (1838 – death 1838.07.11)
 Jacques-Léonard Pérocheau, M.E.P. (born France) (11 July 1838 – 2 April 1856 see below), Titular Bishop of Maxula (1817.09.30 – 1861.05.06), initially as Coadjutor Vicar Apostolic of Szechwan 四川 (1817.09.30 – 1838.07.11)

Apostolic Vicars of Northwestern Szechwan 四川西北 
 Jacques-Léonard Pérocheau, M.E.P. (see above 2 April 1856 – death 6 May 1861)
 Annet-Théophile Pinchon, M.E.P. (born France) (6 May 1861 – death 26 October 1891), Titular Bishop of Polemonium (1859.04.23 – 1891.10.26), initially as Coadjutor Apostolic Vicar of Northwestern Szechwan 四川西北 (China) (1859.04.23 – 1861.05.06)
 Marie-Julien Dunand, M.E.P. (born France) (21 April 1893 – death 4 August 1915), Titular Bishop of Calœ (1893.08.21 – 1915.08.04)
 Jacques-Victor-Marius Rouchouse, M.E.P. (born France) (駱書雅) (28 January 1916 – 3 December 1924 see below), Titular Bishop of Ægeæ (1916.01.28 – 1946.04.11)

Apostolic  Vicar of Chengtu 成都 
 Jacques-Victor-Marius Rouchouse, M.E.P. (駱書雅) (see above 11 April 1946 – see promoted 20 December 1948 see below)

Suffragan Bishops of Chengtu 成都 
 Jacques-Victor-Marius Rouchouse, M.E.P. (駱書雅) (see above 3 December 1924 – death 11 April 1946)
 Henri-Marie-Ernest-Désiré Pinault, M.E.P. (彭道傳) (14 July 1949 – retired 1983), died 1987
John Li Xi-ting (李熙亭) (first Chinese native incumbent) (1958 – death 1989.05.28) - no papal mandate
Michael Liu Xian-ru (劉顯儒) (1992 – death 1998.10.25) - no papal mandate
 Joseph Tang Yuange (唐遠閣)  (2015.12 [2016.11.30] – ...).

See also 
 Catholic Church in Sichuan
 Anglican Diocese of Szechwan
 Our Lady of Lourdes Church, Mianyang
 List of Catholic dioceses in China

References

Sources and external links 
 GCatholic.org with Google satellite photo, data for all sections
 Catholic Hierarchy
 UCA News
 "Give Me Jesus: The Story of a Missionary Priest" by Christopher Zehnder  - an account of a priest who worked within the Diocese of Chengdu

Chengdu
Religious organizations established in 1696
Roman Catholic dioceses and prelatures established in the 17th century
1696 establishments in Asia
Christianity in Chengdu